Andreas Gabalier (born next to Friesach on 21 November 1984) is an Austrian folk singer. In 2012, he won the ECHO music award in folk music category, the Amadeus Austrian Music Award in 2012 as Best Live Act and Best Schlager Singer and in 2013, again the Amadeus award in Folk music category.

Family and private life
Andreas Gabalier is the second oldest of the four children of Wilhelm and Huberta Gabalier. He grew up in Graz. In addition to tournament dancer Willi Gabalier he has one younger brother. The French family name Gabalier comes from a soldier who came to Austria in 1796 in the course of the Italian campaign by Napoleon Bonaparte and remained there.

Gabalier's father died of suicide in 2006, and his younger sister in 2008. The song Amoi seg' ma uns wieder (We will see each other again sometime) is dedicated to them. From 2013 to September 2019, Gabalier was in a relationship with the Austrian moderator Silvia Schneider.

Career
After graduating from commercial high school (HAK) Gabalier began his study of law in Graz. He writes and composes his own songs. His first works were recorded in a hobby studio. In the summer of 2008, Gabalier, then still a law student, presented two of his songs to the ORF Landesstudio Steiermark.

Discography

Albums
Studio albums

Live albums

Compilations

Christmas Albums

Singles

References

External links
 Official website

21st-century Austrian male singers
Schlager musicians
1984 births
Living people
Musicians from Graz